The 1966 LFF Lyga was the 45th season of the LFF Lyga football competition in Lithuania.  It was contested by 15 teams, and Nevezis Kedainiai won the championship.

League standings

References
RSSSF

LFF Lyga seasons
1966 in Lithuania
LFF